In Judaism, a berakhah, bracha,  (pl. , berakhot, ; "benediction," "blessing") is a formula of blessing or thanksgiving, recited in public or private, usually before the performance of a commandment, or the enjoyment of food or fragrance, and in praise on various occasions.

The function of a berakhah is to acknowledge God as the source of all blessing. Berakhot also have an educational function to transform a variety of everyday actions and occurrences into religious experiences designed to increase awareness of God at all times. For this purpose, the Talmudic sage, Rabbi Meir, declared that it was the duty of every Jew to recite one hundred berakhot every day.

The Mishnah of tractate Berakhot, and the gemara in both Talmuds contain detailed rabbinical discussions of berakhot, upon which the laws and practice of reciting blessings are founded.

Berakhot typically start with the words "Blessed are You, Lord our God..."

One who hears another recite a berakhah answers with amen; but one who is engaged in prayer may at certain points be forbidden from other speech, including responding amen. With few exceptions, one does not respond amen to his or her own berakha, although other prayers—such as the kaddish—include "amen" in their text.

Categories of blessings

There are three major categories of berakhah:
on pleasurable experiences ( birkhot ha'nehenin) such as before eating food or smelling fragrances
when performing a commandment (Hebrew:  birkhot hamitzvot) such as the lighting of Sabbath candles 
in praise, gratitude or recognition of God's justice (Hebrew:  birkhot ha'shevach v'ha'hodaya) such as upon seeing awe-inspring natural phenomena, or upon hearing very good or very bad news.

Blessings over food are intended to sanctify the physical act of taking nourishment, those recited before performing a commandment serve to prevent the performance of the activity in an unthinking, rote way, and the blessings of praise serve to remind people of the presence of God in all situations.

Before enjoyment
Judaism teaches that food ultimately belongs to the one great Provider, God, and that to partake of it legitimately one must express gratitude to God by reciting the appropriate blessing beforehand. 

Additionally, there are 5 blessings said after eating different foods: Birkat Hamazon, Al Hamihya, Al Hagefen, Al Ha’etz and Borei Nefashot. These blessings, however, are only required if a certain
predefined amount (Ke'zayit for a solid food, and Revi'it for a liquid) is consumed within a predefined time period (different for solids and liquids).

When performing a mitzvah
Blessings recited before the observance of a mitzvah (commandment) begin with the formula "Blessed are You, Lord our God, King of the Universe, who has sanctified us through his commandments and commanded us to..." and mention the specific mitzvah about to be performed.
 
The blessing over fulfilling the commandment is sometimes followed by another blessing (for example, when lighting the Chanukkah candles, the additional berakhah "...who performed miracles for our ancestors long ago at this season" is recited). When a mitzvah is performed for the first time in the year, the She'hecheyanu blessing ("...who has kept us alive and preserved us and enabled us to reach this season") is also added.

Contrary to the usual pattern of making a blessing before the commandment, the blessing for relieving one's bodily needs and the blessing for ritually rinsing the hands are both recited afterwards. In the former case, it is forbidden to recite any blessing while one feels one's need, and so the blessing is postponed. In the latter case, one may also not recite the blessing beforehand since clean hands are a prerequisite for reciting the blessing. Even if one is certain that one's hands are clean (for example, at the Rabbinically-instituted rinsing before breaking bread), one still recites the blessing afterwards to avoid confusion.

Also contrary to the usual pattern, blessings are said after certain public readings from the Tanakh as well as before it. Examples include the public reading of the Torah, the readings from the prophets called the Haftarah, and the recitation of Psalms of Praise, and the Psalms of the Hallel.

Mitzvot for which a blessing is not recited
No blessing is recited for the performance of certain commandments. Some commentators have suggested that the reason is that no blessing is said before fulfilling commandments which do not involve any action (for example, leaving the corner of the field for the poor), or the observance of which is possible only in undesirable circumstances (for example, granting a divorce, or the return of stolen goods). In the case of other commandments (for example, giving charity), commentators say it is because there is no fixed amount or limit to the observance of the commandment; however, there is no general agreement regarding the underlying principles.

Abudirham wrote that there is more than one reason why these commandments do not have blessings. Abudirham and Rashba suggested a blessing is not recited for tzedakah because the recipient may refuse the gift, and blessings are not recited when it is uncertain whether the mitzvah will be performed. Baruch Epstein suggested that a blessing is not recited on interpersonal mitzvot because the standard blessing text refers to Jews being distinguished from other nations who do not perform the mitzvah; however, non-Jews do perform interpersonal good deeds. Yechiel Yaakov Weinberg suggested that interpersonal mitzvot are done best out of love and care for the recipient, not out of commandment or coercion, so a blessing which refers to the commandment is not recited.

Praise on various occasions
The main purpose of this category of blessings, often called "blessings of praise," is to help remind people of the Creator at all times.

These blessings are said on various occasions, including upon hearing good and bad news; on witnessing awesome natural phenomena such as thunder and lightning, high mountains or the ocean, or a rainbow; upon visiting a place where miracles have been performed in the past, especially in the Land of Israel, and the Birkat ha-Gomel, upon being saved from danger.

The blessing Ha-tov ve-ha-metiv ("Blessed is He Who is good and does good") is recited by a person when they hear good news that will also benefit others, such as news that one has received an inheritance or when rain begins to fall after a drought. It is also said upon the drinking of additional wine that is different from that drunk previously at the meal.

Structure of blessings
Most blessings begin with the words Barukh Attah Adonai ("Blessed are You, Lord"). When the blessing occurs at the beginning of a prayer, the words  ("our God, King of the Universe") are added.

There are three types of formulas for benedictions:

 a short blessing ("short formula") which, after the opening words, is followed by a few words of praise specific to the occasion, for example, the blessing over bread:  ("who brings forth bread from the earth").
 a long blessing ("long formula"), in which the opening is followed by a more elaborate text, for example, in the first section of the Birkat Hamazon (Grace after Meals), after which a concluding blessing formula is recited at the end of the prayer, for example,  ("Blessed are You, Lord, Who feeds all").
 the blessing forms part of a series ("a blessing that is next to another") and the opening formula is omitted, except in the first benediction of each series, and only the conclusion is phrased in the style of a long blessing. The second section of the Birkat Hamazon, for instance, begins with the words   ("We thank You"), and ends with the blessing  ("Blessed are You Lord, for the land and the food").

Safek berakhah 

In certain cases it is doubtful whether a blessing should be said. For example, when someone doesn't remember whether he has already recited the proper blessing or not. One cannot argue to recite the blessing "just to be sure", because it is forbidden to say a "" (an unnecessary blessing) so as not to transgress the grave prohibition of taking God's name in vain. The ruling in such cases is to say the blessing in a D'Oraita case, and to not say it in a D'Rabbanan case.

Reciting amen
The most common context in which an amen is required by halakhah is after one hears a blessing recited. In fact, it is prohibited to willfully refrain from responding amen when it is indicated. The source of this requirement is the verse in Deuteronomy 32:3: "When I proclaim the name of Hashem, give glory to our God."

This mandate refers to the mention of the Tetragrammaton, which was only pronounced at certain specific times within the confines of the Holy Temple in Jerusalem. Whoever heard this special name of God mentioned was obliged to respond with Barukh shem kvod malkhuto l'olam va'ed ("Blessed be the Name of His glorious kingdom for all eternity"). With the destruction of the Temple in 70 CE, however, pronouncing the Tetragrammaton was prohibited, and was replaced with the pronunciation Adonai. Although this term bears significant holiness (and is in fact one of the seven names of God) and may not be pronounced without purpose, it may be pronounced when appropriate in prayer and blessings. The aforementioned response for the Tetragrammaton, however, is not warranted when one hears Adonai pronounced.

The Talmudic Sages therefore mandated that one must answer amen at the completion of a blessing outside of the Temple, comparable to the barukh shem that was used in the Holy Temple. However, while "barukh shem is an expression of praise and honour, amen is an affirmation of belief."

Although amen, in Judaism, is most commonly stated as a response to a blessing that incorporates God's name, amen is more generally an affirmation of any declaration. When reciting amen, it is important that the response is not louder than the blessing itself. When trying to encourage others to respond amen, however, one may raise ones voice to stir others to respond in kind.

Since answering "amen" indicates approval of the content of the blessing, it is appropriate to answer "amen" to another's blessing even if one could not halachically recite the blessing oneself. For example, when the kohanim recite the blessing, "...Who has sanctified us with the holiness of Aaron, and commanded us to bless His people Israel with love," the congregation responds "amen," even though they are not descendants of Aaron the High Priest. Likewise, a Gentile may respond "amen" to a Jew's blessing, even when the blessing contains the text, "...Who has sanctified us with His commandments, and commanded us to...," since by answering "amen," the Gentile is agreeing that the Jew was sanctified with the commandment about to be performed. So too with blessings on foods and smells; one is not required to likewise partake in order to answer "amen."

When one person recites a blessing for another, and the second says "amen", it is considered as if the second person recited the blessing by proxy. In this manner, a person can fulfill their obligation to recite kiddush, or recite a blessing before eating, without saying the actual blessing but rather the one word "amen".

Proper articulation when answering amen
When responding amen, it must be pronounced in a proper manner, consistent with its significance in Jewish law. There are a number of ways to respond amen that are discouraged as being either disrespectful or careless. The articulation of the alef (first letter of amen in Hebrew) and its proper vowelization must be clear. Another type of amen  is one that is recited prior to the completion of the blessing it is being recited to follow; this comes from the Hebrew word  ("snatched"). The impatient rush to respond amen before the blessing has even been completed is prohibited. If insufficient stress is placed on the nun (the last letter of amen in Hebrew) and the mem (the middle letter) drowns it out, this is termed an amen ketufa ("a cut amen"). One must also not recite amen too quickly; one should allocate enough time for the amen as necessary to say ’El melekh ne’eman.

Situations in which one may not recite amen
Although it is not prohibited to say the word amen in vain, the Talmudic Sages indicated particular circumstances in which it is improper to answer amen. An  (אמן יתומה, "orphaned amen") is one such example of an improperly recited amen. There is a dispute among the halachic authorities as to exactly what constitutes an orphaned amen.

 As amen is recited as an affirmation of what a blessing has just asserted, one who is unaware of which blessing was just recited can certainly not affirm its assertion with true conviction. Therefore, if someone just arrives in a place and hears others reciting amen to an unknown blessing, he or she may not respond amen together with them.
 The opposing view maintains a much narrower definition of amen . They assert that its application is limited to a situation in which someone is intending to hear another's blessing and respond amen with the intention of fulfilling his or her obligation to recite that blessing. In such a situation, should any member of the listening party miss hearing any of the words of the blessing, it would be equivalent to an omission of the recital of that word (in accordance with the principle of shomea k'oneh), and a response of amen would thus be prohibited, even though the listener knew which blessing was being recited.
Responding with such an amen is forbidden. If however some people are still responding amen to a blessing, one may begin to respond amen, even if this time interval has passed.

Thus, one should not respond amen to a blessing made by someone who is merely reciting the blessing for educational purposes (i.e. to learn how to recite it). However, one is encouraged to respond amen to children's blessings, even though they are not obligated in the recitation of blessings.

Because one cannot attest to one's own blessing any more than he or she already has by reciting it, responding amen to one's own blessing is redundant and one may not do so. If the blessing is being recited on food, one who responds amen to one's own blessing will either cause a hefseik ("[prohibited] interruption") or likely pronounce an amen , depending on whether one responds immediately or waits until after one swallows some food or drink, respectively.

An exception to this rule is a situation in which an individual is reciting a series of blessings; in such a case, some authorities permit the individual to respond amen to the last blessing in order to signal the ending of the series. While there are many examples of series of blessings within the Jewish prayer services, Ashkenazi tradition dictates that amen is not recited at the conclusion of a series of blessings. The one exception to this is in Grace after Meals after the third blessing of Boneh Yerushalayim; in order to signify that the first three blessings are biblically mandated, as opposed to the fourth rabbinically-mandated blessing, the Talmud mandates that one recite amen at its closing.

When responding amen will constitute a prohibited interruption
An example of this type of situation would be within the evening kiddush on Jewish holidays, when the blessing of sheheheyanu is added within the kiddush prayer.

By listening intently and responding amen to each blessing of the kiddush prayer, all those present can effectively fulfill their obligation to recite kiddush, even though only one person is actually reciting it, via the principle of shomea k'oneh ("One who hears is the equivalent of one who recites").

While men either recite the  blessing in kiddush or dispense their obligation by listening to someone else recite it, women generally recite their  during candle lighting. Rabbi Tzvi Pesach Frank notes that anyone who lit candles should refrain from responding amen to the  blessing during kiddush because it would effectively be an interruption in their fulfillment of reciting kiddush, as they have already recited their  blessing.

See also
Beracah ("Valley of Blessings")
Barakah (Islam; Arabic version)
Baruch (given name)
Brakha (daily prayer in Mandaeism)

References

External links
Brachos.org - Your Source of Blessing - The Largest Bracha Database
Brochos.com - A Reference Database
Jewish Encyclopedia: Berakot

Berakhah
 
Hebrew words and phrases in Jewish prayers and blessings
Religious formulas